Bagong Silang High School (Filipino: Mataas na Paaralan ng Bagong Silang; abbreviated as BSHS) is the second largest public secondary school in Caloocan, Metro Manila, Philippines, and it was established on August 3, 1983.

History  
Mr. Sotero Desaville, then president of the Parent-Teachers Association (PTA) of Bagong Silang Elementary School (BSES) noticed the difficulties of Bagong Silang students in obtaining a secondary education. Mr. Desaville proposed to then president of the Federation of Caloocan PTA, General Oscar Pascual, to establish a secondary school in the area for the children of Bagong Silang residents.

Mr. Pascual's proposal for the first year classroom at the Bagong Silang High School was approved in a meeting attended by the officials of Caloocan Local Government, the Division Office, headed by Mrs. Modesta G. Boquiren, and the Department of Education, Culture, and Sports (DECS). However, the proposed room became a problem because there was no written memorandum to Mr. Innocentes V. Noble, then Bagong Silang Elementary School Principal, that one of the classrooms of BSHS will be used by the first year class. Another meeting was held and it was attended by the former District Supervisor, Mr. Macapagal and former Tala High School Principal, Mr. Cesar Gayod. They conferred with Mr. Noble and advised him that a classroom should be given to the first year class. The PTA officers worked hand in hand to materialize this proposal since they were the ones who worked for the construction of these concrete buildings in elementary school.

In July 1982, the first year class of school year 1982-1983 commenced at Bagong Silang-Tala High School Annex with Mr. Cesar Gayod as its principal. There were 28 students enrolled and their class adviser was Mrs. Frieda R. Escabarte. The room was in one of the concrete buildings of Bagong Silang Elementary School presently occupied by the Principal's Office. As annex to Tala High School, all the school forms and records were kept in main high school. There was no legal name for Bagong Silang High School then.

Before the school year 1982-1983 come to a close, the National Housing Authority (NHA) and the PTA officers led by Mr. Desaville, had their meeting regarding the high school building of five classrooms each at Phase 1 Package 4 and three makeshift buildings with fifteen (15) rooms at Phase 3 Package 3. These academic buildings were constructed by the Bureau of Public Works availed by the NHA through the effort of project manager, Mr. Gaudencio Tobias.

When the local government declared that there was no budget for a new high school that time, Mr. Desaville had to leave his office for a while and coordinated with Mrs. Modesta G. Boquiren, Mr. Bienvenido Icasiano - 3rd District City Superintendent, and Gen. Oscar Pascual for the Bagong Silang High School. With an initial list of more than 1,500 students for BSHS, Mr. Desaville requested 50 teachers. Unfortunately, the said requests were not granted because according to Mr. Gayod, there was no extra budget for the operation of high school classes.

PTA officers headed by Mr. Desaville coordinated to then Metro Manila Commission Vice Governor Ismael Mathay, DECS, Division of City Schools, and the City Budget to allocate a fund for the operations of Bagong Silang High School.

The Metro Manila Commission gave fund for the BSHS teachers and staff on its first year opening, school year 1983–1984. The succeeding years were already under the city local government because Bagong Silang High School was already included in the City Budget. The MMC had an extra amount of P1.2 Million in their budget which was allocated for the teaching force of Bagong Silang High School.

Mrs. Lourdes M. Faustino, the first Principal of BSHS, was assigned to head the Bagong Silang High School. The PTA provided the construction of comfort rooms and desks needed by the students, and even an additional building out of extra construction materials. Mrs. Faustino was behind all this effort and gave support for the opening of Bagong Silang High School.

On August 3, 1983, Bagong Silang High School was formally and legally opened. The original enrollees of 1,104 students composed the first batch of ten (10) first year, six (6) second year, four (4) third year, and two (2) fourth year classes.

With Mrs. Faustino as the school's Officer-in-Charge, Mrs. Avelina V. Alea as Guidance Counselor and at the same time, Fourth Year Filipino Teacher, and Mr. Azur B. Cadag, the first Faculty Club President. The first batch of the school workforce was composed of forty (40) teaching personnel and four (4) non-teaching personnel.

BSHS as 'number one' high school 
Under the leadership of the late principal, Dr. Reynaldo V. Yamsuan, the school hailed as 'number one' high school in the city. BSHS is one of the most performing schools in Caloocan and received awards from NGOs and city local government unit of Caloocan. Dr. Yamsuan is known for its 'iron fist', which he used to change the image of the school by disciplining the students. During his tenure, major school infrastructure projects and beautification efforts were made.

In 2010, Bagong Silang High School adopts the UbD (Understanding by Design) curriculum, which aims to simplify the lessons to students and make fruitful discussions during class time.

In 2012, the Philippine government has launched the K-12 basic education program, which adds 2 more years in high school. Bagong Silang High School is one of the first secondary schools to adopt the K-12 on June 4, 2012.

List of School Principals/Officers-in-Charge 
From that date, the school continued to survive and even strongly flourished in terms of academic advancement and physical improvement under the leadership of hardworking and dedicated principals in their respective years of appointment.

  Mrs. Lourdes M. Faustino (1983 - 1986) 
  Mr. Joel T. San Luis (1986 - 1989)
  Mrs. Clarita B. Ciriaco - OIC (June 1989 - December 1989)
  Mrs. Esmelita P. Ulangca (December 6, 1989 - January 1998)
  Mrs. Adelaida C. Gagarra (January 12, 1998 - July 2007)
  Dr. Reynaldo V. Yamsuan (July 2, 2007 - November 24, 2010)
  Dr. Asuncion A. Manalo - OIC (December 2010 - January 2011)
  Dr. Corazon M. Gonzales - OIC (January 2011 - May 2011)
  Mr. Lazaro R. Gervacio IV (May 4, 2011 – April 4, 2014)
  Dr. Juanito B. Victoria (April 10, 2014 – January 2021)
  Dr. Marissa B. Feliciano (January 18, 2021 - present)

Greenvales of Caloocan 
The official Alma Mater song of Bagong Silang High School is "Greenvales of Caloocan". Since then, it has become the trademark of the school in the whole Division of Caloocan. This was composed by Prudentio Nastor, Master Teacher in English.

Hail! Alma Mater dear
Pride of the Greenvales of Caloocan
We pledge our love, our honor,
And give our hearts to thee..

Beloved school, we owe you
Our knowledge and life's wisdom
Your handy works blesses you
Through time we'll cheer for you

Bagong Silang High School,
Alma Mater dear
With loyalty to your ideals,
We sing our praise to thee.
We sing our praise.

Hail! Alma Mater dear,
It is a joy to keep you memories
Feel and cherish your love and care
We'll be faithful, forever true

Beloved school, we owe you
Our knowledge and life's wisdom
Your handy works blesses you
Through time we'll cheer for you

Bagong Silang High School,
Alma Mater dear
With loyalty to your ideals,
We sing our praise to thee.
We sing our praise.

Hail! Alma Mater dear
Pride of the Greenvales of Caloocan
We pledge our love, our honor,
And give our hearts to thee..

We give our hearts to thee….

References 

Facebook Page https://www.facebook.com/BagongSilangHS

High schools in Metro Manila
1983 establishments in the Philippines
Schools in Caloocan
Educational institutions established in 1983
Public schools in Metro Manila